The India  Medal was a campaign medal approved in 1896 for issue to officers and men of the British and Indian armies.

The India Medal was awarded for various minor military campaigns in India, chiefly for service on the North-West Frontier during 1895 to 1902.  This medal replaced the India General Service Medal (1854). Each campaign was represented by a clasp on the ribbon; seven were sanctioned.

Description
The medal was awarded in silver to soldiers of the British and Indian armies, and in bronze to native bearers and servants.

The name and details of the recipient were engraved on the edge of the medal, normally in running script.

Obverse variations

Clasps
The following clasps were issued with the medal:
 Defence of Chitral 1895
3 March – 13 April 1895
 Relief of Chitral 1895
7 March – 15 August 1895
 Punjab Frontier 1897–98
10 June 1897 – 6 April 1898
 Malakand 1897
26 July – 2 August 1897 (Awarded to troops involved in the Siege of Malakand.)
 Samana 1897
2 August  – 2 October 1897
 Tirah 1897–98
2 October 1897 – 6 April 1898
 Waziristan 1901–02
23 November 1901 – 10 March 1902

References and notes

Bibliography
 Barthorp, Michael. 2002. Afghan Wars and the North-West Frontier 1839–1947 Cassell. 
 Joslin, Litherland, and Simpkin (eds), British Battles and Medals, (1988), Spink
 Mackay, J. and Mussel, J. (eds) – Medals Yearbook – 2006, (2005), Token Publishing.
 Mussell, John W. (ed) – Medals Yearbook – 2015, Token Publishing.
 Wilkinson-Latham, Robert. 1977. North-west Frontier 1837–1947 Osprey Publishing.

External links
 North East Medals, medal guide: India Medal 1895–1902 retrieved 18 November 2018

British campaign medals
Military of British India